Constantim e Cicouro is a civil parish in the municipality of Miranda do Douro, Portugal. It was formed in 2013 by the merger of the former parishes Constantim and Cicouro. The population in 2011 was 2667, in an area of 11.51 km².

References

Freguesias of Miranda do Douro